Khanna Majra is a village in the Ambala district of Haryana, India.

See also
Harbon

Villages in Ambala district